Plumb Point Lighthouse is an active 19th century heritage lighthouse, located on the Palisadoes a narrow peninsular that connects Port Royal to the mainland. The light helps guide shipping into Kingston Harbour.

Built in 1853 it is claimed that the light at the lighthouse has gone out only once since then, during the 1907 earthquake.

The entire lighthouse is painted white and is in the historic Port Royal Protected Area, which the government hopes to develop as a tourist attraction.

It is maintained by the Port Authority of Jamaica, an agency of the  Ministry of Transport and Works.

See also

List of lighthouses in Jamaica

References

External links

Aerial views.
Photos:         .
Historic photo.
Port Authority of Jamaica (flash)

Lighthouses completed in 1853
Lighthouses in Jamaica
Buildings and structures in Saint Andrew Parish, Jamaica